

Alleles

Disease association
A*3002 alters Type 1 diabetes risk

References

3